The 1969 NAIA men's basketball tournament was held in March at Municipal Auditorium in Kansas City, Missouri. The 32nd annual NAIA basketball tournament featured 32 teams playing in a single-elimination format. This is the first tournament since 1965 tournament to feature four new teams to the NAIA Semifinals. (It would be the 5th time since 1937 this has happened; previous years were the inaugural year 1937, 1945, 1947, 1965.) This would not happen again until 2001.

Awards and honors
Leading scorer: Jake Ford, Maryland State; 5 games, 52 field goals, 52 free throws, 156 total points (31.2 average points per game)
Leading rebounder: Bruce Sanderson, Central Washington; 5 games, 65 total rebounds (13.0 average rebounds per game)
Player of the Year: est. 1994
Most tournament appearances: Georgetown (Ky.), 8th of 28, appearances to the NAIA Tournament

1969 NAIA bracket

Third-place game
The third-place game featured the losing teams from the national semifinalist to determine 3rd and 4th places in the tournament. This game was played until 1988.

See also
 1969 NCAA University Division basketball tournament
 1969 NCAA College Division basketball tournament

References

NAIA Men's Basketball Championship
Tournament
NAIA men's basketball tournament
NAIA men's basketball tournament
College basketball tournaments in Missouri
Basketball competitions in Kansas City, Missouri